The Carpe River is a tributary of Petite rivière Eusèbe, flowing in the unorganized territory of Lac-Ashuapmushuan and the municipality of Saint-Félicien, in the Le Domaine-du-Roy Regional County Municipality, in the administrative region of Saguenay–Lac-Saint-Jean, in the province from Quebec, to Canada.

This small valley is mainly accessible by Boulevard du Jardin (route 167).

Agriculture is the main economic activity in this valley.

The surface of the Carp River is usually frozen from the beginning of December to the end of March, except the rapids areas; however, safe traffic on the ice is generally from mid-December to mid-March.

Geography 
The Carpe river originates in Lake Eusèbe in the forest area in the western part of Saint-Félicien, in the unorganized territory of Lac-Ashuapmushuan. This source is located at:
  north-east of a curve in the course of the Rivière aux Saumons;
  south-west of the shore of lac Saint-Jean;
  south-west of the mouth of the Carpe river.

  north-east, to the outlet (coming from the south) of Lac du Repos;
  to the east in an agricultural zone, successively cutting the Chemin du Lac-du-Repos, the Chemin du Rang Simple, and the Chemin du Rang Double, as well as collecting the stream Left (coming from the west), to its mouth.

The Carp river flows on the south bank of the Petite rivière Eusèbe. This confluence is located on the west side of Saint-Félicien, at:

  south-west of the bank of the Ashuapmushuan River;
  west of the mouth of the Ashuapmushuan river;
  west of downtown Alma.

Toponymy 

The toponym "rivière à la Carpe" was formalized on December 5, 1968, at the Place Names Bank of the Commission de toponymie du Québec.

Notes and references

External links 

Rivers of Saguenay–Lac-Saint-Jean
Le Domaine-du-Roy Regional County Municipality